Bovard, Pennsylvania may refer to the following communities in the U.S. state of Pennsylvania:
Bovard, Butler County, Pennsylvania
Bovard, Westmoreland County, Pennsylvania